Luc Besson is a French film director, writer and producer.  He has contributed to many projects as either writer, director, producer, or a combination of the three.

Films

As director

As writer and producer

Television

References
General

Specific

 Hayward, Page 117

External links
Luc Besson at Allmovie

Besson, Luc
Besson, Luc
Filmography